Issiaka Koudize (born 3 January 1987) is a Nigerien footballer, who plays for the Cameroonian club Coton Sport in the Elite One. He was called into Niger national football team and played in all 3 matches of the 2012 Africa Cup of Nations as a reserve player.

References

1987 births
Living people
People from Niamey
Nigerien footballers
Sahel SC players
AS FAN players
AS GNN players
Coton Sport FC de Garoua players
ASN Nigelec players
Elite One players
Niger international footballers
Nigerien expatriate footballers
Expatriate footballers in Cameroon
Nigerien expatriate sportspeople in Cameroon
2012 Africa Cup of Nations players
2013 Africa Cup of Nations players
Association football midfielders
Niger A' international footballers
2016 African Nations Championship players